Soon-tek Oh (O Sun-taek – also spelled as Soon-taek Oh or Soon-taik Oh or Soon-teck Oh; June 29, 1932 – April 4, 2018) was a Korean–American actor. He is best known for the voice of Fa Zhou in Disney's Mulan and the direct-to-video sequel Mulan II and the sadistic Colonel Yin in Missing in Action 2: The Beginning. He has starred in many films, and also acted in television series, including Stargate SG-1, MacGyver, M*A*S*H, Charlie's Angels, Airwolf, Magnum, P.I., Hawaii Five-O, Kung-Fu, Zorro, Baa Baa Black Sheep and Touched by an Angel.

Early life
Oh was born on June 29, 1932 in Mokpo during the period when Korea was under Japanese rule. He attended high school at Gwangju, South Korea, and attended Yonsei University in Seoul.

After the end of Japanese rule in August 1945 and before the outbreak of the Korean War in June 1950, he and his family immigrated to the United States where he attended the University of Southern California. He later gained an MFA from UCLA.

Acting career
On Broadway, he appeared in the original cast of the Stephen Sondheim musical Pacific Overtures. He was an early member of East West Players, an Asian American theatre group founded in 1965.

In 1995 he founded the Korean American theatre group, Society of Heritage Performers, which later evolved into the present Lodestone Theatre Ensemble. From 2005, he had been a chair professor at Seoul Institute of the Arts.

Death
Oh died in Los Angeles on April 4, 2018 at age 85 after a lengthy battle with Alzheimer's disease, according to actor Chil Kong.

Partial filmography

Films
 1966 Murderers' Row as Tempura, Japanese Secret Agent (uncredited)
 1967 Yongary, Monster From The Deep as Chinese Agent (uncredited)
 1971 Earth II as Chinese Diplomat (uncredited)
 1971 One More Train to Rob as Yung
 1974 The Man with the Golden Gun as Lieutenant Hip (as Soon-tiak Oh)
 1978 Good Guys Wear Black as Major Mhin Van Thieu, The Black Tigers
 1980 The Final Countdown as Simura, Imperial Japanese Navy Air Service Pilot
 1982 The Letter as Ong
 1985 Bialy smok as Tai Ching
 1985 Missing in Action 2 as Colonel Yin 
 1985 Yuki Shimoda as Himself (interviewed)
 1987 Steele Justice as General Bon-soong Kwan
 1987 Biały smok as Tai-ching
 1987 Death Wish 4: The Crackdown as Detective Phil Nozaki
 1989 Soursweet as "Red" Cudgel
 1989 Collision Course as Chief Inspector Kitao
 1993 A Home of Our Own as Mr. Munimura
 1994 Red Sun Rising as Yamata
 1994 S.F.W. as Milt Morris
 1996 Street Corner Justice as Kwong-chuck Lee
 1997 Beverly Hills Ninja as Sensei
 1998 Yellow as Woon Lee
 1998 Mulan as Fa Zhou (voice)
 2000 The President's Man as General Vinh Tran
 2001 Roads and Bridges as Father (voice)
 2001 Forgotten Valor as Colonel
 2001 True Blue as "Tiger"
 2002 The Visit as Sujong's Father
 2002 SWAT as Sayonara
 2004 Mulan II as Fa Zhou (voice)
 2005 Last Mountain as Karus
 2006 Gang-jeok as Jong-chae (final film role)

Television (partial list)
 1967 The Invaders as Houseboy
 1968-1979 Hawaii Five-O (8 episodes) as Robert Kwon / David Chung / Chaing / Tom Wong / Vic Tanaka / Lao / Lewis Shen / Wo Fat's Lab Technician
 1974 Kung Fu as Chen Yi
 1975-1982 M*A*S*H (5 episodes) as Joon – Sung / Ralph / Dr. Syn Paik / Korean Soldier / Mr. Kwang
 1977 Logan's Run as Dexter Kim
 1977 Baa Baa Black Sheep as Lieutenant Miragochi / Colonel Tokura
 1979 How the West Was Won as Kee
 1980 Diff'rent Strokes as Mr. Kim
 1981-1986 Magnum, P.I. (4 episodes) as General Nguyen Hue / Sato / Dr. Bill Su & Dr. Ling
 1981 East of Eden as Lee
 1982 Quincy, M.E. as Captain Bob Nishimura
 1983 Hart to Hart as Lang Chen-cheng
 1983 Girls of the White Orchid as Hatanaka
 1983 Marco Polo as Wang Zhu
 1984 The Master as Lika
 1984-1987 Airwolf (3 episodes) as Minh / Tommy Liu / Hiyashi
 1985-1986 T.J. Hooker (2 episodes) as Ginsu Nabutsu / Nguyen Chi
 1987 Sky Commanders as Kodiak (voice)
 1988 MacGyver as Raymond Ling
 1992 Highlander: The Series as Kiem Sun
 1993 The Legend of Prince Valiant as Sing Lu (voice)
 1994 Babylon 5 as The Muta-Do
 1994-1995 Kung Fu: The Legend Continues (3 episodes) as Bon-bon Hai
 1996 The Real Adventures of Jonny Quest as General Yala (voice)
 1997 Life with Louie as Buddhist Monk (voice)
 1997 Stargate SG-1 as Moughal
 2000 King of the Hill as Monk (voice)

Accolades 
In 2008, Soon-tek Oh was awarded the Lifetime Achievement Award by the San Diego Asian Film Festival.

References

External links

Soon-tek Oh(Aveleyman)...(older version)

1932 births
2018 deaths
20th-century American male actors
People with acquired American citizenship
American dramatists and playwrights of Korean descent
University of Southern California alumni
South Korean emigrants to the United States
UCLA Film School alumni
People from South Jeolla Province
People from Mokpo
American male actors of Korean descent
American male film actors
American male television actors
Deaths from Alzheimer's disease
Deaths from dementia in California